

Listed below are executive orders and presidential proclamations signed by United States President Warren G. Harding. His executive orders and presidential proclamations are also listed on WikiSource.

Executive orders

1921

1922

1923

Presidential proclamations

1921

1922

1923

References

 
United States federal policy